The following is a list of ecoregions in French Polynesia, according to the Worldwide Fund for Nature (WWF).

Terrestrial
French Polynesia is in the Oceanian realm

Tropical and subtropical moist broadleaf forests
 Marquesas tropical moist forests
 Society Islands tropical moist forests
 Tuamotu tropical moist forests
 Tubuai tropical moist forests

Freshwater
 Marquesas
 Society Islands
 Tubuai Islands

Marine
French Polynesia is in the Eastern Indo-Pacific marine realm.

Southeast Polynesia province
 Tuamotus
 Rapa-Pitcairn
 Southern Cook/Austral Islands
 Society Islands

Marquesas province
 Marquesas

References 
 Abell, R., M. Thieme, C. Revenga, M. Bryer, M. Kottelat, N. Bogutskaya, B. Coad, N. Mandrak, S. Contreras-Balderas, W. Bussing, M. L. J. Stiassny, P. Skelton, G. R. Allen, P. Unmack, A. Naseka, R. Ng, N. Sindorf, J. Robertson, E. Armijo, J. Higgins, T. J. Heibel, E. Wikramanayake, D. Olson, H. L. Lopez, R. E. d. Reis, J. G. Lundberg, M. H. Sabaj Perez, and P. Petry. (2008). Freshwater ecoregions of the world: A new map of biogeographic units for freshwater biodiversity conservation. BioScience 58:403-414, .
 Spalding, Mark D., Helen E. Fox, Gerald R. Allen, Nick Davidson et al. "Marine Ecoregions of the World: A Bioregionalization of Coastal and Shelf Areas". Bioscience Vol. 57 No. 7, July/August 2007, pp. 573–583.

 
French Polynesia
ecoregions in French Polynesia
ecoregions